The Interactive Compilation Interface (ICI) is a plugin system with a high-level compiler-independent and low-level compiler-dependent API to transform current black-box compilers into collaborative modular interactive toolsets. It was developed by Grigori Fursin during MILEPOST project. The ICI framework acts as a "middleware" interface between the compiler and the user-definable plugins. It opens up and reuses the production-quality compiler infrastructure to enable program analysis and instrumentation, fine-grain program optimizations, simple prototyping of new development and research ideas while avoiding building new compilation tools from scratch. For example, it is used in MILEPOST GCC to automate compiler and architecture design and program optimizations based on statistical analysis and machine learning, and predict profitable optimization to improve program execution time, code size and compilation time.

Developments 
ICI is now available in mainline GCC since version 4.5

 Collaborative development website
 Google Summer of Code'2009 extensions: enabling fine-grain program optimizations including polyhedral transformations, function level run-time adaptation and collective optimization]
 Development mailing list

Downloads 
 ICI 2.0 - released for GCC in May, 2009.
 ICI 1.0 - released for GCC in 2008.
 ICI beta - developed for GCC in 2006–2008.
 ICI beta - developed for Open64/PathScale compilers in 2004–2006.

References

Interfaces